Chief Dental Officer (often abbreviated CDO) may refer to:

Chief Dental Officer (Canada), a government officer and head of dental services in Canada
Chief Dental Officer (United Kingdom), a government officer and head of dental services in the UK
 Chief Dental Officer (Republic of Ireland)